Tombu Jonubi (also Romanized as Tombū Jonūbī and Tombū Janūbī) is a village in Kushk-e Nar Rural District, Kushk-e Nar District, Parsian County, Hormozgan Province, Iran. At the 2006 census, its population was 252, in 38 families.

References 

Populated places in Parsian County